Dinah Soar is a fictional superheroine appearing in American comic books published by Marvel Comics.

Publication history
Created by John Byrne, Dinah Soar first appeared in West Coast Avengers vol. 2 #46 (July 1989).

Etymology
Her name resembles the word dinosaur, her surname resembles the verb "to soar", which is a term used to indicate flight, which she is capable of.

Fictional character biography
Dinah Soar was born in the Savage Land. Her lineage is never revealed and it is unknown if she was actually a mutant or of alien descent.

Because she never spoke English, her background remains entirely unknown, but she became a founding member of the Great Lakes Avengers when Mr. Immortal first assembled the team. She is shown utilizing the ability to calm Mr. Immortal when he becomes overwhelmed with stress and rage after he returns to life. When they discovered that they were soulmates, the two became romantically involved.

She was first seen in public with the team by Hawkeye and Mockingbird, who later agreed to become their mentors. During training, Mr. Immortal fell into the Darkforce Dimension through his teammate, Doorman. Dinah responded quickly by flying inside Doorman to rescue Mr. Immortal. With the team, she helped Hawkeye and the West Coast Avengers against "That Which Endures." They also assisted Mockingbird in a holding action against Terminus. After aiding the Thunderbolts against the villain Graviton, the team clashed with the mercenary Deadpool.

GLA: Misassembled
During the G.L.A. mini-series, the team took on Maelstrom who was trying to destroy the universe. During the battle, Mr. Immortal is killed leaving Dinah Soar to calm him down while the others continued to fight. After Mr. Immortal is revived, Dinah is killed by Maelstrom with an energy blast. Her death plunged Mr. Immortal into a deep depression. He later recovered after defeating and capturing Deathurge, who had been taking the souls of his loved ones. She is later seen by Doorman in a limbo-like afterlife, playing cards with the other deceased GLA members.

Powers and abilities
Dinah Soar possesses natural wings and with extensive training, she is an agile flyer. She can utilize the wing-like sharpness as efficient weapons. Dinah has a hypersonic voice that allows her to project inaudible sound waves, as well as an empathic rapport capable of calming down Mr. Immortal every time he resurrects himself. Her own race have very long lifespans, which she once said. She even carries a whistle to communicate or alert others in emergencies.

References

External links
 Dinah Soar at Marvel.com

Avengers (comics) characters
Characters created by John Byrne (comics)
Comics characters introduced in 1989
Marvel Comics aliens
Marvel Comics mutants
Fictional characters who can manipulate sound
Fictional characters with slowed ageing
Fictional pterosaurs
Marvel Comics female superheroes
Marvel Comics extraterrestrial superheroes